Trowulan is a subdistrict in the Mojokerto Regency of Indonesia's province of East Java. It is home to the Trowulan archaeological site and the Trowulan Museum.

References

Districts of East Java